The Gaomei Lighthouse is a lighthouse in Qingshui District, Taichung, Taiwan.

History
The lighthouse was originally built in 1967, but its operation was stopped in 1982 when the lighting equipment was moved to the lighthouse in Port of Taichung. Years later, the lighthouse underwent renovation led by Maritime and Port Bureau. The lighthouse was officially opened to tourists on 27 September 2014, managed by the Ministry of Transportation and Communications.

Architecture

Transportation
The lighthouse is accessible west from Taichung Port Station of Taiwan Railways.

See also

 List of tourist attractions in Taiwan
 List of lighthouses in Taiwan

References

External links

 Maritime and Port Bureau MOTC

2014 establishments in Taiwan
Lighthouses in Taiwan
Lighthouses completed in 1967
Buildings and structures in Taichung